Gia Kavtaradze (born 1970, in Tbilisi, Georgia) is the member of the Cabinet of Georgia and the Minister of Justice in the nation of Georgia. A lawyer by training, he has practiced law in Georgia, and worked in a series of NGO and Government jobs. He fluently speaks Russian, English and Georgian.

Biography

Kavtaradze was born in Tbilisi in 1970. He studied international law and international relations at Tbilisi State University, followed by a Masters in Law at Indiana University in the USA. From 1994 to 1998 he worked for a series of Non Governmental Organization in Tbilisi, including the Red Cross, UNICEF, and UNDP. From 1998 to 2002 he worked in the Council of Justice, apart from an eight-month period as director of the Justice Training Center, a not-for-profit institution. From 2002 to 2005 he left government, becoming managing partner of the law firm Kavtaradze & Partners.

Kavtaradze returned to politics in 2005, becoming chair of the Central Election Commission, and was appointed Minister of Justice in December 2005.

See also
Politics of Georgia

Notes and External Links
 Official biography
 Biography from Transparency International

1970 births
Living people
Lawyers from Tbilisi
Politicians from Tbilisi
Government ministers of Georgia (country)